Maxim Alyapkin (born February 28, 1993) is a Russian ice hockey goaltender. He is currently playing with Buran Voronezh of the Supreme Hockey League (VHL).

Alyapkin was selected 4th overall by HC Vityaz Podolsk in the 2010 KHL Junior Draft. On January 13, 2015, Alyapkin made his Kontinental Hockey League debut playing with Torpedo Nizhny Novgorod during the 2014–15 KHL season, playing a total of three games for the team.

References

External links

1993 births
Living people
Torpedo Nizhny Novgorod players
People from Podolsk
HK Lida players
Rubin Tyumen players
Russian ice hockey goaltenders
HC Sarov players
Sputnik Nizhny Tagil players
Sportspeople from Moscow Oblast